Holly Avenue Historic District is a national historic district located at Winston-Salem, Forsyth County, North Carolina.  The district encompasses 115 contributing buildings and 1 contributing site in a predominantly residential section of Winston-Salem.  The buildings date between about 1885 and 1952, and include single family dwellings and apartment building.  The include examples of late-19th and early-20th popular architectural styles including the Queen Anne and Italianate style.  Notable buildings include the Henry Case House (c. 1885), James Jessup House (c. 1889), Henry Foltz bam (1906), Calvary Moravian Church (1923), T. R. Brann's store (c. 1921), and Green Front Grocery (c. 1937).

It was listed on the National Register of Historic Places in 2002.

References

Residential buildings on the National Register of Historic Places in North Carolina
Historic districts on the National Register of Historic Places in North Carolina
Queen Anne architecture in North Carolina
Italianate architecture in North Carolina
Buildings and structures in Winston-Salem, North Carolina
National Register of Historic Places in Winston-Salem, North Carolina